Antifaschistisches Infoblatt (AIB) is an anti-fascist publication in Berlin, Germany. It was founded in 1987 and the first issue appeared in Spring. The magazine is published four times a year. The publication cooperates with similar publications in other countries, including Expo and Searchlight. It has been a member of Antifa-Net since 2003.

References

External links
 Official website

1987 establishments in West Germany
Anti-fascism in Germany
German-language magazines
Quarterly magazines published in Germany
Political magazines published in Germany
Magazines established in 1987
Magazines published in Berlin